Glass working refers collectively to a wide range of techniques and artistic styles that use glass as the primary medium. Some common forms of glass working are:

Glassblowing, the creation of hollow objects such as bottles and vases by blowing air through molten glass
Glass sculpture, works sculpted or molded from glass
Stained glass, glass colored by various means, usually in an artistic fashion

See also
Glass beadmaking
Glass polishing
Glass production
History of glass

Other media
metal working
wood working

Glass